Kulture Yabra FC was established as Yabra Sporting Club in 1974 and are the former three time champions of the Belize Premier Football League (BPFL) of the  Football Federation of Belize.  The club participated in the first BPFL National Championship final during the 1991–92 season, claiming second place behind La Victoria (of Corozal Town).

Kulture Yabra FC was based in Belize City, Belize and competed on the MCC (Cricket) Grounds.

Achievements
Belize Premier League: 3 
 2000/01, 2001/02, 2003 (Dissident League)

List of coaches
  Marvin Ottley (2000–04)

External links
https://web.archive.org/web/20160303180751/http://www.yabrakulture.8m.com/

Football clubs in Belize
Association football clubs established in 1974
1974 establishments in Belize